

Fritz Albrecht (23 December 1905 – 29 April 1977) was a German officer in the Wehrmacht of Nazi Germany during World War II and a Brigadegeneral in the Bundeswehr of West Germany. He was a recipient of the Knight's Cross of the Iron Cross.

Awards and decorations
 Iron Cross (1939) 2nd Class (7 October 1939) & 1st Class (29 May 1940)
 Honour Roll Clasp of the Army (17 February 1944)
 German Cross in Gold on 14 January 1942 as Major in Artillerie-Regiment 13
 Knight's Cross of the Iron Cross on 19 April 1945 as Oberst and commander of Kampfgruppe Magdeburg

References

Citations

Bibliography

 
 
 

1905 births
1977 deaths
Bundeswehr generals
German police officers
Recipients of the Gold German Cross
Recipients of the Knight's Cross of the Iron Cross
Military personnel from Berlin
People from the Province of Brandenburg
Brigadier generals of the German Army